= 1995 Civic Democratic Party leadership election =

Czech political party election

- 19 November 1995
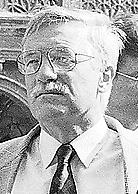
Candidate	Václav Klaus
Electoral vote	259
Percentage	95.22%
Leader of ODS before election
Václav Klaus
Elected Leader of ODS
Václav Klaus

A leadership election for the Civic Democratic Party (ODS) was held in the Czech Republic on 19 November 1995. Václav Klaus was reelected as party's leader. Klaus ran unopposed and received 259 votes of 272.
